National Route 491 is a national highway of Japan. The highway connects Shimonoseki, Yamaguchi and Nagato, Yamaguchi.

References

491
Roads in Yamaguchi Prefecture